The 1983 Cleveland Browns season was the team's 34th season with the National Football League.

Season summary 

In a season which was eerily similar to the 1979 campaign, which was arguably the beginning of "The Kardiac Kids" period, seven contests were decided by seven points or less, with the Browns going 4–3. Like the '79 and '80 seasons, the Browns scored often and gave up almost as many points, with the Browns scoring 356 to their opponents' 342. Quarterback Brian Sipe, in his last season with the Browns before jumping to the USFL, had 26 touchdown passes and 23 interceptions, nearly the same ratio (28-to-26) he had had in 1979. It was a good way to go out for Sipe, who had lost his starting job to Paul McDonald late in the 1982 season and then re-gained it in the '83 training camp. Fullback Mike Pruitt, in his last great season with the Browns, rushed for 1,184 yards. And finally, in his last season in Cleveland before being traded to the Denver Broncos, wide receiver Dave Logan was second on the team in receptions with 37, but that was far behind the team-record 89 hauled in by Pro Football Hall of Fame tight end Ozzie Newsome in a season that could be dubbed "The Kardiac Kids' Last Hurrah".

Offseason

NFL draft 
The following were selected in the 1983 NFL Draft.

Regular season

Schedule

Note: Intra-division opponents are in bold text.

Game Summaries

Week 2 
Brian Sipe throws four touchdowns to lead the Browns to a 31-26 win at Detroit. Sipe becomes Cleveland's career leader, raising his TD total to 135 (surpassing Frank Ryan) with throws to Ricky Feacher, Mike Pruitt, Ozzie Newsome and Dave Logan. Pruitt also rushes for 137 yards.

Week 4 
TV Network: NBC
Announcers: Jay Randolph and Bob Chandler
Harry Holt, a 25-year-old NFL rookie, catches a 48-yard touchdown pass from Sipe on Cleveland's fourth play of overtime as The Browns beat The Chargers, 30-24, at San Diego. Holt catches his first NFL touchdown after Matt Bahr forces overtime with a 32-yard field goal with 18 seconds left in regulation.

Week 6 
TV Network: NBC
Announcers: Dick Enberg and Merlin Olsen
Linebacker Tom Cousineau records 15 tackles, one interception and one fumble recovery while leading Cleveland to a 10-7 win over the New York Jets. His interception stops a Jets drive at the Browns' 5-yard line and his fumble recovery stops New York at the Cleveland 9. The Browns' only touchdown is scored by wide receiver Bobby Jones on a 32-yard pass from Sipe.

Week 8 
The Browns lose a tough one at Cincinnati, 28-21, when Bengals' cornerback Ken Riley intercepts a Sipe pass and returns it 42 yards for a touchdown midway through the fourth quarter. Riley's 60th career interception spoils a three-TD pass performance by Sipe.

Week 12 
After going eight seasons without a shutout, the Browns made it two straight with a 30-0 rout of the Patriots at Foxboro. One week after posting a 20-0 win over Tampa Bay, Pruitt runs for 136 yards and Matt Bahr kicks three field goals. The defensive star is linebacker Chip Banks, who returns an interception 65 yards for a touchdown and records two sacks. Cousineau and Hanford Dixon each intercept two passes.

Standings

Personnel

Staff / Coaches

Roster

Awards and records 
 Brian Sipe, NFL Leader, Touchdown Passes (26), Tied with another player

References

External links 
 1983 Cleveland Browns at Pro Football Reference
 1983 Cleveland Browns Statistics at jt-sw.com
 1983 Cleveland Browns Schedule at jt-sw.com
 1983 Cleveland Browns at DatabaseFootball.com  

Cleveland
Cleveland Browns seasons
Cleveland Browns